Alban Stepney  or Stepneth (died 1611) was an English politician who sat in the House of Commons at various times between 1572 and 1611.

Stepney was the son of Thomas Stepney of Aldenham, Hertfordshire and his wife Dorothy (Dorati) Winde daughter of John Winde (also Weind or Wynde and Wyld) of Ramsey Lincolnshire. He matriculated as a scholar from Christ's College, Cambridge in Autumn 1562 and entered Clement's Inn. In 1561, he was  appointed registrar of the diocese of St. David's.  In 1572, he was elected Member of Parliament for Haverfordwest. He was High Sheriff of Pembrokeshire from 1572 to 1573. He was commissioner for the tanneries in Pembrokeshire in 1574  and was a J.P. for Pembrokeshire from 1575. He was elected MP for Haverfordwest again in 1584 and in 1586. In 1589 he was elected MP for Cardigan. He was Sheriff of Pembrokeshire again from 1589 to 1590 and was High Sheriff of Carmarthenshire from 1596 to 1597. He became Deputy Lieutenant in 1602. In 1604 he was elected MP for Pembrokeshire. He was High Sheriff of Pembrokeshire again from 1604 to 1605. He acquired the property of Prendergast from his first wife, and was some time created Knight Banneret. 
 
Stepney married firstly Margaret Cathern daughter of Thomas Catharn or Cadern of Prendergast and secondly Mary Philipps, daughter of William Philipps of Picton. His eldest son John was created a baronet in 1621.

References

 

Year of birth missing
1611 deaths
Members of the Parliament of England (pre-1707) for constituencies in Wales
Alumni of Christ's College, Cambridge
High Sheriffs of Pembrokeshire
High Sheriffs of Carmarthenshire
Stepney family
English MPs 1572–1583
English MPs 1584–1585
English MPs 1586–1587
English MPs 1589
English MPs 1604–1611
Knights banneret of England